The Duke of Wellington is a grade II listed public house at 94a Crawford Street, London.

References

External links 

Website: http://thedukew1h.co.uk/

Grade II listed pubs in the City of Westminster
Buildings and structures in Marylebone